Stephen Garvin  (1826 – 23 November 1874), born in Cashel, County Tipperary, was an Irish recipient of the Victoria Cross, the highest award for gallantry in the face of the enemy that can be awarded to British and Commonwealth forces.

Details
He was around 31 years old, and a colour-sergeant in the 1st Battalion, 60th Rifles, British Army during the Indian Mutiny when the following deed took place on 23 June 1857 at Delhi, India for which he was awarded the Victoria Cross:

Further information
Garvin died in Chesterton, Cambridge on 23 November 1874, and is buried in St. Andrew's Parish Churchyard there.  His Victoria Cross is in private ownership, having been bought by Conservative peer Lord Ashcroft at auction in 2014.

References

Listed in order of publication year 
The Register of the Victoria Cross (1981, 1988 and 1997)

Ireland's VCs  (Dept of Economic Development, 1995)
Monuments to Courage (David Harvey, 1999)
Irish Winners of the Victoria Cross (Richard Doherty & David Truesdale, 2000)

External links
Location of grave and VC medal 

1826 births
1874 deaths
Burials in Cambridgeshire
19th-century Irish people
British Army recipients of the Victoria Cross
British military personnel of the Second Anglo-Sikh War
Indian Rebellion of 1857 recipients of the Victoria Cross
Irish recipients of the Victoria Cross
Irish soldiers in the British Army
King's Royal Rifle Corps soldiers
People from County Tipperary
Recipients of the Distinguished Conduct Medal
Military personnel from County Tipperary